Sebastian "Seba" Sorsa (born 25 January 1984) is a Finnish former footballer.

Career 
After a successful winter trial, Sorsa signed for Leeds United, joining on an 18-month contract in a Bosman transfer from Finnish side HJK Helsinki on 2 January 2008.

Sorsa failed to break into the Leeds first team, however, and he signed for newly promoted Scottish Premier League side Hamilton Academical in August 2008. He was released by Accies in January 2009. Sorsa joined Helsinki on 25 January 2009 on a free transfer.

He used to be the captain of HJK.

On 11 November 2016 Sorsa signed with KuPS a two-year contract to cover seasons 2017 and 2018, however after the season 2017, he decided to finish his professional career.

International 
He is a former Finnish under-21 international and plays as a right back.

References

Guardian Football

1984 births
Living people
Leeds United F.C. players
Hamilton Academical F.C. players
Helsingin Jalkapalloklubi players
Finnish footballers
Finland international footballers
Finnish expatriate footballers
Finnish expatriate sportspeople in England
Expatriate footballers in England
Expatriate footballers in Scotland
Scottish Premier League players
Finnish expatriate sportspeople in Scotland
Kyrkslätt Idrottsförening players
Association football wingers
Association football defenders
Footballers from Helsinki